Peppino De Filippo (born Giuseppe De Filippo; 24 August 1903 – 27 January 1980) was an Italian actor.

De Filippo was born in Naples, brother of actor and dramatist Eduardo De Filippo and of Titina De Filippo. He made his stage debut at the age of six. He played in several movies such as Rome-Paris-Rome, Variety Lights, A Day in Court, Ferdinand I, King of Naples and Boccaccio '70. He is however most remembered for his several artistic partnerships with Totò, on movies such as Totò, Peppino e la malafemmina and La banda degli onesti. He died in Rome at age 76.

Biography
He was born from the affair between playwright and actor Eduardo Scarpetta and theatre seamstress and costumier Luisa De Filippo. He was the third of three children born from the couple, the other two being Annunziata "Titina" and Eduardo. His father was actually married since 1876 to Rosa De Filippo, Luisa's paternal aunt. His father Eduardo had several other illegitimate children from various affairs (including actors Ernesto Murolo, Eduardo Passarelli and Pasquale De Filippo).

After several attempts with different acting companies, as a utility player, in 1931 he and his siblings founded the Compagnia Teatro Umoristico: i De Filippo.
It was a very successful experience, featuring tours all over Italy, new comedies, enthusiastic ratings by critics, and sold out in theaters.

However, in 1944, due to a controversy with his brother, Peppino abandoned the company. The separation would allow him to find his own stylistic footprint as an author, being easily distinguishable from Eduardo's: Peppino's comedies are usually easier and more brilliant.

Peppino repeatedly showed his extraordinary versatility; particularly noteworthy are his performance in The Caretaker by Harold Pinter and in The Miser by Molière (as Harpagon), where he proved to be a skillful actor whose ability had grown beyond brilliant and dialect plays.

Peppino should be defined an actor as well as a popular TV and cinema star.
His partnership with Totò in many films has been one among the most interesting collaborations in the Italian comical cinema genre. Their movies obtained an outstanding success, despite being snubbed by critics. Worth a mention are Totò, Peppino e la malafemmina, Totò, Peppino e i fuorilegge, and La banda degli onesti. He worked with Federico Fellini as well, for instance in Boccaccio '70, and with Alberto Lattuada.

He also invented Pappagone, a character for a TV show. He represented a humble servant of Cummendatore Peppino De Filippo (the title of Commendatore is a public honour of the Italian Republic). He performed as a sort of usher, a typical character of the Neapolitan theatre, and coined many funny phrases and an own jargon, that would transform into popular sayings.
He married three times, and his first wife Adele Carloni gave him Luigi, who successfully carried on his father's work.

He was married three times. From his first wife Adele (or Adelina) Carloni he had his only child, Luigi De Filippo. His second wife was actress Lidia Martora (pseudonym of Lidia Maresca) and was the sister of dancer Marisa Maresca. He married for the third time to Lelia Mangano. The actor Pietro Carloni (his first wife Adele's brother) was married to his sister Titina. The actress Ester Carloni was another sibling of his wife Adele.

Filmography

 Three Lucky Fools (1933) - Andrea
 Il cappello a tre punte (1933) - Luca, il mugnaio
 Those Two (1935) - Giacomino
 It Was I! (1937) - Carlino
 L'amor mio non muore... (1938) - Luigino Spanato, il detective
 The Marquis of Ruvolito (1939) - Il marchese Erasmo di Mezzomondello
 In the Country Fell a Star (1939) - Luigino Montuori
 Il sogno di tutti (1940) - L'avvocate fanfarone
 Lucky Night (1941) - Biagio Natalini
 L'ultimo combattimento (1941) - Alberto
 A che servono questi quattrini? (1942) - Vincenzino Esposito
 Le signorine della villa accanto (1942) - L'autista
 Non ti pago! (1942) - Procopio Bertolini
 After Casanova's Fashion (1942) - Don Agostino
 The Peddler and the Lady (1943) - Aurelio
 Non mi muovo! (1943) - Pasqualino Squeglia
 Ti conosco, mascherina! (1943) - Celestino De Rosa
 I Met You in Naples (1946)
 Natale al campo 119 (1947) - Gennarino Capece, il napoletano
 Vivere a sbafo (1949)
 Biancaneve e i sette ladri (1949) - Rag. Peppino Biancaneve
 The Transporter (1950) - Tony La Motta
 Luci del varietà (1951) - Checco Dal Monte
 Beauties on Bicycles (1951) - Il ladro
 Rome-Paris-Rome (1951) - Gennaro
 Cameriera bella presenza offresi... (1951) - L'avvocato
 The Passaguai Family (1951) - Cavalier Massa
 Ragazze da marito (1952) - Giacomino Scognamiglio
 Totò e le donne (1952) - Il dottor Desideri
 Non è vero... ma ci credo (1952) - Gervasio Savastano
 Siamo tutti inquilini (1953) - Antonio Scognamiglio
 Martin Toccaferro (1953) - Martino Lazzari
 Una di quelle (1953) - Martino
 Il più comico spettacolo del mondo (1953) - Uno spettatore
 A Day in Court (1954) - Judge Salomone Lorusso
 Via Padova 46 (1954) - Arduino Buongiorno
 Peppino e la nobile dama (1954) - Zaganella
 Le signorine dello 04 (1955) - Revisore Delli Santi, il vedovo
 Il segno di Venere (1955) - Mario
 Gli ultimi cinque minuti (1955) - Filippo Roberti
 The Two Friends (1955) - Ciccillo
 Accadde al penitenziario (1955) - Peppino
 Io piaccio (1955) - Nicolino
 Cortile (1955) - Ragionier Gargiulo
 I pappagalli (1955) - Beppi
 Un po' di cielo (1955)
 Piccola posta (1955) - Pipinuccio Gigliozzi
 Motivo in maschera (1955) - signor Cuciniello
 La banda degli onesti (1956) - Giuseppe Lo Turco
 Guardia, guardia scelta, brigadiere e maresciallo (1956) - Guardia Scelta Giuseppe Manganiello
 Totò, Peppino e la malafemmina (1956) - Peppino Caponi
 Totò, Peppino e i fuorilegge (1956) - Peppino
 La nonna Sabella (1957) - Emilio
 Vacanze a Ischia (1957) - Battistella
 Peppino, le modelle e chella là (1957) - Peppino
 Anna di Brooklyn (1958) - Peppino
 Totò, Peppino e le fanatiche (1958) - Cavalier Peppino Caprioli
 Pane, amore e Andalusía (1958) - Peppino
 Tuppe tuppe, Marescià! (1958) - Don Percuoco
 Policarpo, ufficiale di scrittura (1959) - Cavalier Cesare Pancarano di Rondò
 Arrangiatevi! (1959) - Giuseppe 'Peppino' Armentano
 La nipote Sabella (1959) - Emilio
 La cambiale (1959) - Peppino Posalaquaglia
 Ferdinando I re di Napoli (1959) - Ferdinand I.
 I genitori in Blue-Jeans (1960) - Giuseppe 'Peppino' Grimaldi
 Il mattatore (1960) - Chinotto
 Gentlemen Are Born (1960) - Pio Degli Ulivi
 Letto a tre piazze (1960) - Prof. Peppino Castagnano
 Who Hesitates is Lost (1960) - Giuseppe Colabona
 A noi piace freddo...! (1960) - Titozzi
 Gli incensurati (1961) - Giuseppe Corona
 Totò, Peppino e la dolce vita (1961) - Peppino
 Il carabiniere a cavallo (1961) - Il brigadiere Tarquinio
 Il mio amico Benito (1962) - Giuseppe Di Gennaro
 Totò e Peppino divisi a Berlino (1962) - Giuseppe 'Peppino' Pagliuca
 Boccaccio '70 (1962) - Dr. Antonio Mazzuolo (segment "Le tentazioni del dottor Antonio")
 I quattro monaci (1962) - Fra' Crispino
 I quattro moschettieri (1963) - Cardinal Richelieu
 The Shortest Day (1963) - Zio Peppino
 Totò contro i 4 (1963) - Alfredo Fiori
 Adultero lui, adultera lei (1963) - Il pubblico ministero
 Gli onorevoli (1963) - Giuseppe Mollica
 I 4 tassisti (1963) - Pasquale Scognamiglio (segment "Opera buona, Un'")
 La vedovella (1965) - Don Pietro, il sindaco
 Made in Italy (1965) - Mimi (segment "5 'La Famiglia', episode 1")
 Ischia operazione amore (1966) - Gennaro Capatosta
 La fabbrica dei soldi (1966) - Carmelo Pappagone
 Rita la zanzara (1966) - Carmelo
 Non stuzzicate la zanzara (1967) - Carmelo
 Soldati e capelloni (1967) - Peppino Pica
 Totò story (1968) - Peppino
 Zum zum zum (1969) - Peppino Bertozzini
 Zum, zum, zum n° 2 (1969) - Peppino Bertozzini
 Lisa dagli occhi blu (1969) - Peppino / Amleto
 Gli infermieri della mutua (1969) - Gennarino Esposito
 Ninì Tirabusciò: la donna che inventò la mossa (1970) - Magistrate
 Giallo napoletano (1979) - Raffaele's Father (final film role)

Theater works
Trampoli e cilindri, (Un atto in dialetto napoletano) (1927)
Un ragazzo di campagna, (Farsa in due parti) (1931)
Don Raffaele il trombone, (Commedia in un atto) (1931)
Spacca il centesimo, (Commedia in un atto) (1931)
Miseria bella, (Farsa in un atto) (1931)
Cupido scherza...e spazza, (Farsa in un atto in dialetto napoletano) (1931)
Una persona fidata, (Farsa in un atto) (1931)
Aria paesana, (Storia vecchia uguale per tutti in un atto) (1931)
Quale onore!, (Farsa in un atto) (1931)
Amori...e balestre!, (Farsa in un atto in dialetto napoletano) (1931)
Caccia grossa!, (Un atto ironico romantico) (1932)
A Coperchia è caduta una stella, (Farsa campestre in due parti) (1933)
La lettera di mammà, (Farsa in due parti) (1933)
Quaranta...ma non li dimostra, (Commedia in due parti in collaborazione con Titina De Filippo) (1933)
Il ramoscello d'olivo, (Farsa in un atto) (1933)
I brutti amano di più, (Commedia romantica in tre parti) (1933)
Un povero ragazzo!, (Commedia in tre atti e quattro quadri) (1936)
Il compagno di lavoro!, (Un atto in dialetto napoletano) (1936)
Bragalà paga per tutti!, (Un atto in dialetto napoletano) (1939)
Il grande attore!, (Commedia in un atto) (1940)
Una donna romantica e un medico omeopatico, (Da una commedia -parodia in cinque atti di Riccardo di Castelvecchio. Riduzione in tre atti in dialetto napoletano) (1940)
Non è vero... ma ci credo!, (Commedia in tre atti) (1942)
Quel bandito sono io!, (Farsa in tre atti e quattro quadri) (1947)
L'ospite gradito!, (Tre atti comici) (1948)
Quel piccolo campo..., (Commedia in tre atti) (1948)
Per me come se fosse!, (Commedia in due parti e quattro quadri) (1949)
Carnevalata, (Un atto) (1950)
Gennarino ha fatto il voto, (Farsa in tre atti) (1950)
I migliori sono così, (Farsa in due parti e otto quadri) (1950)
Pronti? Si gira!, (Satira buffa in un atto) (1952)
Pranziamo insieme!, (Farsa in un atto) (1952)
Io sono suo padre!, (Commedia in due parti e quattro quadri) (1952)
Pater familias, (Commedia in un atto) (1955)
Noi due!, (Commedia in un atto) (1955)
Un pomeriggio intellettuale, (Commedia in un atto) (1955)
Dietro la facciata, (Commedia in un atto) (1956)
Le metamorfosi di un suonatore ambulante, (Farsa all'antica in un prologo, due parti e cinque quadri. Con appendice e musiche di Peppino De Filippo) (1956)
Il talismano della felicità, (Farsa in un atto) (1956)
La collana di cento noccioline, (Commedia in un atto) (1957)
Omaggio a Plauto, (Un atto) (1963)
Tutti i diavoli in corpo, (Un atto) (1965)
L'amico del diavolo, (Commedia in tre atti) (1965)

Bibliography
 Giulia Lunetta Savino (introduction by Massimo Troisi). Il buffone e il poveruomo, Dedalo, 1990.
 Enrico Giacovelli, Enrico Lancia. Peppino De Filippo, Gremese, 1992.
 Rodolfo Di Gianmarco, Leila Mangano. TuttoPeppino, Gremese, 1992.
 Alberto Anile. Totò e Peppino, fratelli d'Italia, Einaudi, 2001.
 Marco Giusti. Pappagone e non solo. Mondadori, 2003. 
 Antonella Ottai. Vita è arte: Peppino De Filippo. Rai Eri, 2003.
 Pasquale Sabbatino, Giuseppina Scognamiglio. Peppino De Filippo e la comicità nel Novecento. Edizioni scientifiche italiane, 2005.

References

External links

1903 births
1980 deaths
Male actors from Naples
Italian television personalities
Nastro d'Argento winners
20th-century Italian male actors